Coccosteoidea is an extinct superfamily of arthrodire placoderms that lived during the Devonian period.

Phylogeny
Eubrachythoraci is divided into the sister clades Pachyosteomorphi and Coccosteomorphi, the latter of which can be further sub-divided into the two sister superfamilies Coccosteoidea and Incisoscutoidea, as shown in the cladogram below:

References 

Arthrodires